Viktor Vladimirovich Pyatanov (born 29 December 1976) is a former Russian football player.

References

1976 births
Living people
Russian footballers
FC Lokomotiv Nizhny Novgorod players
Russian Premier League players
FC Torpedo NN Nizhny Novgorod players
Association football defenders